Margot Mayo (May 30, 1910 – ) was an American dance instructor, educator, and collector of folk music.

Early life 
Margot Mayo was born Margaret Melba Mayo on May 30, 1910 in Commerce, Texas, the youngest of eight children of William Leonidas Mayo, the founding president of East Texas Normal College."Mayo Family Collection", Texas A&M University-Commerce Libraries. Accessed March 16, 2021.

Career 
She was a key figure in the 1940s New York City revival of folk dancing and square dancing and American folk music.  She was founder of the American Square Dance Group in 1934 and editor of its magazine, Promenade, and published the manual The American Square Dance in 1943.  She and her American Square Dance Group perform on the 1947 Pete Seeger documentary To Hear Your Banjo Play.

The folk revival in New York City was rooted in the resurgent interest in square dancing and folk dancing there in the 1940s, which gave musicians such as Pete Seeger popular exposure.

Margo Mayo was also a teacher of music and dance in the school system in New York City.

Personal life 
Margo Mayo lived with her sister Gladys who was a piano teacher and piano faculty member at Juilliard School of Music from 1921 to 1950. They lived near Juilliard on Riverside Drive.

Death 
Margot Mayo died in May 1974 in New York City.

Selected bibliography

References 
Cantwell, Robert. When We Were Good: The Folk Revival. Cambridge: Harvard University Press, 1996.  

 

Created via preloaddraft
Folklorists
1910 births
1974 deaths
Square dance